Rybczynski may refer to:

 Natalia Rybczynski (born 1971), paleobiologist
 Tadeusz Rybczynski (1923-1998), economist
 Witold Rybczyński (1881-1949) physicist and mathematician
 Witold Rybczynski (born 1943), architect
 Zbigniew Rybczyński (born 1949), filmmaker
  Craig Rybczynski (born 1972), play-by-play announcer for professional lacrosse team, Rochester Knighthawks
  Catherine Rybczynski (born 1953), elected official

See also

 Hadamard–Rybczynski equation
 Rybczynski theorem

de:Rybczyński